Plectostoma sciaphilum was a species of land snail in the family Diplommatinidae. This species was originally found on a single limestone karst at Bukit Panching (3°53'28"N, 103°8'26"E), in Peninsular Malaysia. In 2007, this karst was quarried, thus destroying the only known site of occurrence for this species. Plectostoma species are allopatric, being in found in dozens of isolated karst hills where few species occur, meaning that limited gene flow exists and only negligible hybridization occurs. Shell is distinctly convex, tuba shape similar to that of Plectostoma senex and P. turriforme, but this species lacks basal constriction teeth. Shell height: 2.6–2.9 mm, width: 1.5–1.6 mm.

References

Gastropods described in 1952
Diplommatinidae